Vishan may refer to:
Vishan, Iran
Vishan, Sofia Province, Bulgaria